"What's Your Fantasy" is a song and debut single by American rapper Ludacris from his independently released debut album Incognegro and his first major label studio album Back for the First Time. As a single, it was released on September 12, 2000 via Disturbing tha Peace/Def Jam South. Produced by Shondrae "Bangladesh" Crawford, it features guest appearance from fellow DTP signee Shawnna. The song is focused around the narration of explicit sexual fantasies. In addition to discussion of sexual intercourse and fellatio, Ludacris hints at cunnilingus and role-playing in the song.

The song peaked at #21 on the Billboard Hot 100, at #19 on the Official Singles Chart Top 100, and was certified Platinum by the Recording Industry Association of America. It was included in the soundtrack album for Jesse Dylan's 2001 stoner comedy film How High. In 2008, the song was ranked number 58 on VH1's 100 Greatest Hip-Hop Songs.

Remix and sequel
The official remix of this song features Trina, Shawnna and Foxy Brown, each of whom has their own verse, in addition a new verse by Ludacris on the single version, which last only 4:50 (the radio edit clean single version) & 5:44 (the explicit single version), on the album version, his verse was removed and he only raps the chorus and says "remix" on the beginning and each woman say the female part of the chorus, which last only 4:36. In the remix, the three female artists go even further with more explicit references to cunnilingus and analingus.

The fifth song off Chris Brown's six-track mixtape X Files is titled "Fantasy 2" which features Ludacris. He raps the famous "lick lick lick you from your head to your toes" line from "What's Your Fantasy" prior to his verse. The mixtape was released on November 19, 2013.

Live performances
On April 2, 2015, in promotion of his eighth studio album Ludaversal, Ludacris performed a special acoustic rendition of the song with The Roots on The Tonight Show Starring Jimmy Fallon.

Charts

Weekly charts

Year-end charts

Certifications

References

External links

1999 songs
Shawnna songs
Ludacris songs
Dirty rap songs
2000 debut singles
Songs written by Ludacris
Def Jam Recordings singles
Music videos directed by Jeremy Rall
Songs written by Bangladesh (record producer)
Song recordings produced by Bangladesh (record producer)